The North American tektite strewn field is a large area, known as a strewn field, in North America defined by the presence of tektites consistent with having come from the same bolide. The field is believed to be associated with the Chesapeake Bay impact crater.

References

Strewn field (meteorite)